Ornithogalum divergens is a species of flowering plant in the star-of-Bethlehem genus Ornithogalum (family Asparagaceae). It is native to central Europe and the Mediterranean region. It is the hexaploid cytotype of Ornithogalum umbellatum, a triploid.

References

divergens
Flora of Morocco
Flora of Tunisia
Flora of Southwestern Europe
Flora of Germany
Flora of Czechoslovakia
Flora of Hungary
Flora of Southeastern Europe
Flora of Western Asia
Plants described in 1847